Eintracht Frankfurt Basketball  is a German professional sports club located in Frankfurt am Main. 
The club played three seasons in the Basketball Bundesliga. (1967–69, 1979/80)

It is the men's basketball department of Eintracht Frankfurt, a major multi-sport club.

There is a close cooperation between Eintracht Frankfurt and the nearby Skyliners Frankfurt. To be more competitive, the two clubs have merged their top youth teams.

Notable players
To appear in this section a player must have either:
- Set a club record or won an individual award as a professional player.
- Played at least one official international match for his senior national team at any time.
 Alex King 
 Antric Klaiber
 Brian Myers

References

External links
Presentation at Eurobasket.com

Basketball teams established in 1954
Basketball clubs in Hesse
Basketball